The green-tailed bristlebill (Bleda eximius) is a species of songbird in the bulbul family, Pycnonotidae. It is found in West Africa from Sierra Leone to Ghana. Its natural habitat is tropical moist lowland forests. It is threatened by habitat loss. The green-tailed bristlebill was originally described in the genus Trichophorus (a synonym for Criniger). Formerly, some authorities considered the yellow-lored bristlebill as conspecific with the green-tailed bristlebill.

References

External links

 https://web.archive.org/web/20090819023218/http://www.arkive.org/green-tailed-bristlebill/bleda-eximius/
 http://ibc.lynxeds.com/species/green-tailed-bristlebill-bleda-eximius

green-tailed bristlebill
Birds of West Africa
green-tailed bristlebill
Taxonomy articles created by Polbot